The Venom Mob is the colloquial title of a group of actors from the Shaw Brothers Studio, popular creators of martial arts films in the 1970s and 1980s. Most were friends since childhood and attended the Fu Sheng Drama School in Taiwan before meeting director Chang Cheh and moving on to the Shaw Brothers studio in Hong Kong.

They appeared in numerous Shaw films, but did not become a group in high demand until Five Deadly Venoms. They were the main choreographers in all of their films, highly skilled Chinese weapon experts, talented actors, and excellent acrobats. Their films usually dealt with Chang Cheh's common themes of brotherhood, valor, and betrayal.

As with most groups, time saw their talents being pulled in different directions, not to mention in-fighting for starring roles and production credits.

Roster
This is a list of the main five (though there are six, Chiang Sheng is actually the fifth member of the Venoms, not Wei Pai, who only appeared in four films with the others).

Second tier Venoms
Those listed (males) usually were the supporting villains with Lu Feng, if Lu Feng had a rare hero role, the lead villain was usually either Wang Lung-Wei or Wang Li. Lung Tung-Sheng was usually a questionable character in a film who ended up siding with the heroes in the end. Females listed were usually "eye-candy" and got little fighting time in Venom films.
 Wang Lung Wei - The villain in several early Venom films. Made his debut in Chang Cheh's Shaolin Martial Arts, filmed in Taiwan during 1974.
 Wang Li - Appeared in later Venom films replacing the absent Wei Pai, usually as a villain, and great with weapons. Wang Li was also recruited in Taiwan and appeared in bit parts in New Shaolin Boxers and Chinatown Kid before his official debut in Shaolin Rescuers. Best known as Chief #3 in Masked Avengers and a Wudang Master in 2 Champions Of Shaolin.
 Sun Shu-Pei - Usually a villain with minimal kung fu skills, but very conniving and sneaky. Only heroic role was as "Long Axe" in Kid with the Golden Arm.
 Yang Hsiung - Better known as "Brass Head" in Kid with the Golden Arm. Appeared throughout Chang Cheh's Venom cycle of films in various heroic and villainous roles.
 Lau Shi Kwong - The cowardly type, best known as the snitch Wong Fa in Five Deadly Venoms and as "The Dangerous Kid" in Flag of Iron.  He also played the henchman known as "Leopard Boy," in Shaolin Rescuers as well as one of the seven Shaolin pupils in 2 Champions Of Shaolin.
 Cheng Tien-Chi - Another master of Peking opera, Cheng made his debut in The Brave Archer 3, followed by House of Traps and Ode to Gallantry, and would later take the lead roles in Five Elements Ninjas, The Weird Man and The Nine Demons.
 Chu Ko - Also debuted in The Brave Archer 3 and continued into the 1980s replacing Sun Chien, usually as an insidious villain. Would later achieve heroic status in the later films Five Element Ninjas and The Weird Man
 Lung Tien-Sheng - Best known as "The Spearman" from Flag of Iron; usually a misguided  anti-hero.
 Wen Hsueh-Erh - Lead female in Sword Stained with Royal Blood, Ode to Gallantry, 2 Champions Of Shaolin, as well as The Brave Archer and His Mate. Excels at playing spoiled brat roles.
 Yu Tai Ping – The lead henchman in earlier Venom films, would later switch sides during 1981's Flag of Iron (literally) as his appearances afterwards were usually of the second-tier heroic nature in the films Masked Avengers and The Weird Man. He was one of the lead "Super Ninjas" in Chang Cheh's gore-filled opus Five Elements Ninjas alongside Cheng Tien-Chi, Wang Li and Chu Ko.
 Tony Tam Jan Dung - A henchman and usually partnered with Yu Tai Ping, Yang Hsuing or Lau Shi Kwong and serves as under Lu Feng's character. He was usually seen as a character in background before becoming a top henchman in Crippled Avengers. He is best known as "Tiger Boy" in Shaolin Rescuers and one of the seven Shaolin pupils in 2 Champions Of Shaolin. Just like the Venoms' Sun Chien, he also uses tae kwon do and was known for his kicking ability.
 Shirley Yu - One of Shaw's leading ladies, appeared alongside the Venom Mob in Chang Cheh's Chinatown Kid, Life Gamble, and The Brave Archer 2.
 Pan Ping-Chang – Usually the lead female in Venom films. After a cameo appearance in Crippled Avengers, she went on to co-star as Swordswoman Leng in Kid with the Golden Arm, and portrayed Kuo's wife in Legend of the Fox. 
 Chin Siu-Ho - First appeared in small role in The Rebel Intruders prior to making his official credited debut in 2 Champions Of Shaolin. Proceeded to co-star in Ten Tigers of Kwangtung, Legend of the Fox and Masked Avengers among others, in addition to films for other directors at Shaw after Chang Cheh's cohorts disbanded.

Venom Films
Films directed by Chang Cheh (or a Venom) that feature at least three Venoms in starring roles.

Venom-Related Films
Films directed by Chang Cheh that feature Venoms in supporting roles or fewer than three Venoms in starring roles.

See also
Cinema of Hong Kong
Hong Kong action cinema
Shaw Brothers Studio

Shaw Brothers Studio films